Okhansky District is an administrative district (raion) of Perm Krai, Russia; one of the thirty-three in the krai. Municipally, it is incorporated as Okhansky Municipal District. It is located in the southwest of the krai. Its administrative center is the town of Okhansk. Population:  The population of Okhansk accounts for 44.6% of the district's total population.

Geography
The Kama River is the largest in the district and forms the district's border with Permsky District.

History
The district was established in December 1923. It was merged into Ochyorsky District on February 1, 1963 but was restored on January 12, 1965.

Demographics
Ethnic composition:
Russians: 94.3%
Komi-Permyak people: 1.5%
Tatars: 1.1%

Economy
The economy of the district is based mostly on light industry and agriculture.

References

Notes

Sources

Districts of Perm Krai
States and territories established in 1923
States and territories disestablished in 1963
States and territories established in 1965